Lazydays RV is an American company specializing in the sales and service of recreational vehicles, RV rentals, parts and accessories. The company was founded in 1976 and operates 8 locations in 7 states, including Tucson, Arizona; Denver, Loveland, Colorado and Elkhart, Indiana, Minneapolis, Minnesota; Knoxville, Tennessee; Houston, Texas; The Villages, Florida; and its headquarters in Seffner, Florida.

Lazydays RV positions itself as the world’s largest RV dealership, with 3,000 new and used RVs from 78 manufacturers across their 8 locations, nearly 400 service bays, 700 campsites at 2 on-site campgrounds and an RV resort at their Florida location. At each location, Lazydays also has a store dedicated to specialty and OEM parts called Accessories & More. They also feature a fleet of rental vehicles at their Colorado locations.

Lazydays RV is the exclusive RV sponsor of the Florida Gators, Tampa Bay Buccaneers and the Denver Broncos.

Lazydays Holdings, Inc. is a publicly listed company on the NASDAQ stock exchange under the ticker "LAZY".

History

Founded in Tampa, Florida, in 1976, Lazydays RV was originally owned by the Wallace family, which included Herman and his sons Don and Ron. Lazydays RV was founded with only two travel trailers and $500. During its first five years, the dealerships limited itself to selling travel trailers and mini motorhomes. Sales grew to $13 million by 1980 and $50 million by 1983. Herman Wallace retired in 1993 and Don Wallace took over the business. The current Chairman & CEO is William P. "Bill" Murnane.

Lazydays RV established a second location in 2011 in Tucson, Arizona, when it purchased a dealership owned by Beaudry RV. Lazydays RV acquired several dealerships in Colorado from RV America and Discount RV Corner, which are located in Denver and Loveland. With the acquisition of the dealership in Loveland, Lazydays RV is now home to the world's largest indoor showroom. In August 2018 Lazydays RV purchased Shorewood RV in Anoka, Minnesota. In October 2018, Lazydays RV brought their total number of dealerships to 6 with the purchase of Tennessee RV in Knoxville, Tennessee. In August 2019, Lazydays RV purchased Alliance Coach in Wildwood, Florida, which it would rename Lazydays RV of The Villages. In February 2020 Lazydays opened its first Texas location, Lazydays RV Service Center of Houston in Waller, Texas.

Sponsorships

In 2015, Lazydays RV announced their partnership with the University of Florida Gators. to sponsor sanctioned tailgating events held in the campus RV lots for official college sports events. In 2016, Lazydays RV announced a partnership with the NFL's Denver Broncos  and Tampa Bay Buccaneers.

References

Recreational vehicles
Retail companies established in 1976
Companies based in Florida
Private equity portfolio companies
Vehicle retailers
Companies that filed for Chapter 11 bankruptcy in 2009